"Roller" is a song by the Canadian rock band April Wine, released off their 1978 studio album First Glance. The song peaked at number 25 on the RPM 100 Singles chart in Canada and number 34 on the Billboard Hot 100 on April 28, 1979 in the United States, becoming their first American hit since 1972.

The song was instantly popular in North America, and helped April Wine regain international success, as it was their first hit song outside of Canada since 1972's "You Could Have Been a Lady", after a decade of success limited to their home country of Canada. "Roller" remains a staple of the band's discography, and remains a staple of classic rock radio in both Canada and the United States.

Background
Myles Goodwyn, main singer and songwriter for April Wine, penned the song in 1976, though it wasn't recorded until 1978, and was decided to be released as a single from the album, becoming the album's biggest hit.

Charts

Weekly Charts

Year-End Charts

In popular culture
"Roller" has been featured in several films, most notably Joe Dirt (2001), Grown Ups 2 (2013), and The Heat (2013). It also has been in several television shows such as Freaks and Geeks season 1, episode 3, "Tricks and Treats"; the "Pilot" episode of The Americans in 2013, season 2, episode 6 "Take Me Away" of Being Erica in 2011; and the 2009 Canadian documentary The Beat Goes On: Canadian Pop in the 1970s, which also included several other April Wine songs.

References

1978 songs
1978 singles
April Wine songs
Songs written by Myles Goodwyn